The discography for the Japanese boy band w-inds. consists of 40 singles and 13 studio albums since their major label debut in 2001.

Albums

Studio albums

Compilation albums

Remix albums

Singles

As lead artist

As featured artist

Promotional singles

Guest appearances

Other charted songs

Videography

Video albums

Music videos

Other discography

DVDs
 "Private of W-inds" (6 February 2002) - ??? copies sold

References

External links
 w-inds. release summary at Oricon

Discographies of Japanese artists
Pop music group discographies